Jonathan Hugh Quarmby (born 20 December 1961 in Huddersfield), is an English record producer and songwriter and son of English architect Arthur Quarmby.

Biography
Studying architecture at Sheffield University, he soon became a part of the city's vibrant music scene, initially as a keyboard player, performing on Yazz's album Wanted and touring with local band, Floy Joy. His transition to record production came with Barclay artists Fred de Fred. Jonathan then collaborated with Axis Studio-based Comsat Angels bass player Kevin Bacon to write and produce Ephraim Lewis's album Skin for Elektra Records.

This partnership (Bacon and Quarmby) went on to produce and write a diverse range of music: electro as R&S artists Manna, Britpop with The Longpigs, rock with Mew, pop with The Sugababes, classical crossover with David Garrett, UK hip hop with Plan B, and were most publicly lauded for their contribution to reggae, with Brit Award-winning Finley Quaye (Maverick a Strike) and Grammy Award-winning Ziggy Marley (Fallen Is Babylon).

Moving from Sheffield to London's RAK Studios in 2003, they continued to produce, but in 2004, set up the online music distribution company AWAL. This grew to be one of the UK's biggest and most innovative aggregators, distributing over 3,000 artists, including The Arctic Monkeys, David Gray, and Madness. It also spawned the metrics platform, Buzzdeck. In 2006 Quarmby was on the judging panel for the music competition Pringles Unsung.

In 2012, they sold AWAL to US publisher Kobalt, and continued to work on the integration of the businesses.

In 2014 Quarmby and Bacon parted ways, with Quarmby leaving Kobalt to return to song writing and record production. Once again based at RAK Studios, he is signed to RAK publishing and has a studio in the building.

Discography

Production
Tycho Jones - Don't Be Afraid (2020)
Children In Need - Got It Covered - P/M tracks and single No.1 Uk (contested)
James Arthur - You (2019) - tracks - P No.2 UK 
Lewis Capaldi - (2018) Tough W/P
Tom Walker – Just You And I  (2017/9) P/M - no.1 UK
James Arthur – Back From The Edge - tracks - (2016) W/VxP. – no.1 UK 
Benjamin Clementine – At Least For Now (2015) P/M – Mercury prize winning
Kawala - EP and singles (2018) W/P/M
MIka - It's My House - single - 2018 W/P
MIka - My Name Is Michael Holbrook (2019) track P
James Morrison - You're Stronger Than You Know (2019) - track W
Laurence Fox - A Grief Observed (2019) - W/P/M 
Leo Stannard - Gravity (2017) single P/M
Nikhil - Tracks and singles (2018) W/P
Dan Owen - Tracks and singles (2018) W/P
Alex the Astronaut - Waste of Time (2018) W/P
Aura Dione – Love Somebody (2016) W/P
Light House Family - tracks (2017) W/P - NO.3 UK
Patricia Kaas – Patricia Kaas (2016) W/P
George Oglivie – October (2016) W/P/M
George Oglivie – Foreign Hands (2016) W/P/M
Tiken Jah Fakoli – Racines (2015) P/M
Jacob Banks – Move With You (2014) P
Daley – Broken (2014)
Gabrielle Aplin – Coming Home (2015)
Tiken Jah Fakoli – Derniere Appel (2014)
Misty Miller – Misty Miller (2012)
Plan B – Mamma (2006)
Finley Quaye – Maverick a Strike (1997)
Sugababes – "Round Round" single (2002)
Molotov Jukebox "Bang EP" (2012)
The Longpigs – The Sun Is Often Out (1996)
The Longpigs – Mobile Home (1999) 
Beth Rowley – Little Dreamer (2007) 
Oi Va Voi – Laughter Through Tears (2004) 
 Oi Va Voi – Travelling the Face of the Globe (2009)
 Iwan Rheon – Changing Times EP
Ziggy Marley & The Melody Makers – Fallen Is Babylon (1997)
Des'ree – Dream Soldier (2003)
The Pretenders – Loose Screw (2002)
David Garret – Virtuoso (2007)
Richard Hawley – Run for Me (2003), The Ocean (2005)
Primal Scream – Sometimes I feel so Lonely (2006)
Ben Taylor – Another Run Around the Sun (2005)
Lightning Seeds – Dizzy Heights (1996)
Shaznay Lewis – Open (2004)
Karima Francis – The Author (2009)
David Ford – Songs for the Road (2007)
Lighthouse Family – Whatever Gets You Through The Day (2001))
Ephraim Lewis – Skin (1992)
Manna – Manna (1994)
Tiken Jah Fakoli – L'Africain (2007)
Tiken Jah Fakoli – African Revolution (2010)
Dick Rivers – L'Homme Sans Age (2008)
Ian Brown – "Can't See Me" single (1998)
The Stands – All Years Leaving (2004)
Eagle Eye Cherry – "Save Tonight" single (1997)
Mew – And the Glass Handed Kites (2005)
Fred De Fred – Treize En Vie
Ben Onono – Badagry Beach (2000)
Netsayi – Monkey's Wedding (2009)
Del Amitri – Hatful of Rain (1998)
Koot – Mississippi Soul (1999)
Beverley Knight – 100% (2009)
 Soul Survivor (Beverley Knight song) by Beverley Knight
 Sophie Solomon – Poison Sweet Madeira (2006)
 Tony Christie – Now's the Time (Single) (2011)
 The Dualers – Don't Go (single) (2006)

Writing 
James Arthur – 4 tracks incl 2nd single
Lewis Capaldi - single
James Morrison - single
Adam French - single
Kawala - single
Alex the Astronaut - single
Dan Owen - tracks and single
Nikhil - tracks and singles
Dan Caplan - single TBC
Daniel Merriweather - single
Calum Scott - Tracks
Aine Cahill - tracks
Billy Locket - tracks
Declan Donovan - tracks
Light House Family - tracks
Johanna - tracks
Kovacs - tracks
Karima Francis - track
Liza Owen - tracks
Sarah Walk - track
Andreus Mo - tracks
Joseph J Jones - track
Rhys Lewis - tracks
Jeremy Loops - track and single
Joseph Salvat - track
Shane Filan - track
Janet Devlin - tracks and single
Cold Specs - tracks
Maximillion - tracks
George Ogilvie – single
Aura Dionee – singles
Ephraim Lewis – Skin
Tiken Jah Fakoli – Africain Revolution
Tiken Jah Fakoli – L'Africain
Manna – Manna – Album
Emji – You Are The One (winner Nouvelle Star France)
Jodie Abacus – tracks
John Buckley – tracks
Deborah Scarlette – tracks
Liza Owen – tracks
Cathryn McGrath – tracks
Ethan Basden – tracks
Leo Standard – tracks
Brian Deadi – tracks
Natasha Beddingfield – Tracks
Luke Burr – tracks
Ady Suleman – Tracks
Duffy – Tracks
Jacob Banks – Tracks
Caitlyn Scarlet – Tracks
Laura Wilde – Tracks
Kimberley Henderson – Tracks
Corey Sanders – Tracks
Roya – Tracks
Shane Filan of Westlife – one track, co-wrote "Girl in My Heart" with Filan and Fiona Bevan included in Filan's third album "Love Always"

References

External links

English record producers
Living people
1961 births
Musicians from Huddersfield
Alumni of the University of Sheffield